The 2018 FIBA U18 Women's African Championship was the 15th edition, played under the rules of FIBA, the world governing body for basketball, and the FIBA Africa thereof. The tournament was hosted by Mozambique from August 10 to 19, 2018 in Maputo.

Hosts Selection
On 23 March 2018, FIBA Africa Central Board announced that Maputo, Mozambique as the host city for the tournament.

Venue

Draw  
The draw for this tournament took place on 9 August 2018 at the Resotel Hotel in Maputo.

Qualification

Qualified teams
as of 24 July 2018:
  − Tournament Hosts
  − Zone V Winner
  − Zone V
  − Zone II
  − Zone VI
  − Zone VII
  − Zone I
  − Zone V Runners-Up/Wild Card

Preliminary round
The draw was held in Maputo, Mozambique on 9 August 2018.

All times are local (UTC+2).

Group A

Group B

Final round

Bracket

Quarterfinals

5–8th place semifinals

Semifinals

Seventh place match

Fifth place match

Bronze medal match

Final

Awards

All-Tournament Team

 Filipa Calisto
 Bella Murekatete
 Alexia Dizeko
 Assetou Sissoko
 Aminata Sangare

Final standings

Notes

References

FIBA Africa Under-18 Championship for Women
Bask
2018 in African basketball
International basketball competitions hosted by Mozambique
August 2018 sports events in Africa
FIBA